Manypenny Agreement is a United States Congressional act passed on February 28, 1877, it officially removed ownership of the Black Hills from the Lakota Sioux and the United States took control of 900,000 acres of the Black Hills.

References

44th United States Congress
Statutory law